Christopher Perle (born 17 December 1974) is a former footballer who played as a forward. He represented the Mauritius national team at international level, scoring 11 goals.

Career
Perle played abroad with SC Paderborn (Germany), La Passe FC (Seychelles), US Stade Tamponnaise and SS Jeanne d'Arc. For the Mauritius national team, he made 50 appearances scoring 11 goals.

References

External links
 
 

1974 births
Living people
Mauritian footballers
Association football forwards
Mauritius international footballers
Mauritian Premier League players
SC Paderborn 07 players
La Passe FC players
SS Jeanne d'Arc players
Curepipe Starlight SC players
Mauritian expatriate footballers
Mauritian expatriate sportspeople in Germany
Expatriate footballers in Germany
Mauritian expatriate sportspeople in Réunion
Expatriate footballers in Réunion
Mauritian expatriate sportspeople in Seychelles
Expatriate footballers in Seychelles